The Gymnase intercantonal de la Broye (GYB) is a secondary school (gymnasium) in Payerne, Vaud, Switzerland. The school serves students living in the Broye-Vully district in Vaud canton and Broye district in Fribourg canton.

The school opened in August 2005. The municipalities in the service area include Vully commune and the regions of Avenches, Estavayer-le-lac, Moudon, and Payerne.

The school includes a library, the 350 conference room L'Aula, a 100-seat conference room, 40 computer labs, the exhibition space L'espace de la Blancherie, a gymnasium, and a fitness room.

Accreditation
GYB's (upper) secondary education (Middle and High School) is approved as a Mittelschule/Collège/Liceo by the Swiss Federal State Secretariat for Education, Research and Innovation (SERI).

References

External links

 Gymnase intercantonal de la Broye 

Secondary schools in Switzerland
Educational institutions established in 2005
2005 establishments in Switzerland
Buildings and structures in the canton of Vaud